You scratch my back may refer to:
You Scratch My Back, Batman episode
Quid pro quo form of exchange of goods or services, by the phrase "you scratch my back, and I'll scratch yours"